Corey Daniel Hartzog is an American voice actor that works primarily for Seraphim Digital and Sentai Filmworks. In anime, he is known as the voice of Tatsumi from the popular Akame ga Kill series, Masamune Matsuoka from Aoharu x Machinegun, Ichiro Sato from the Aura: Koga Maryuin's Last War, Quon Mitsuchi from the Towa no Quon movies, Kanato Sakamaki from the Diabolik Lovers series, Noiz from Dramatical Murder, Sugane Tachibana from the Gatchaman Crowds series, Toshikazu Asagi from Majestic Prince, and Yuya Bridges in Muv-Luv Alternative: Total Eclipse.

Filmography

Anime

Film

References

External links 
Corey Hartzog on Twitter

1988 births
Living people
21st-century American male actors
American male voice actors